Wahai may be :

Saleman language 
Manusela language